Almut Brömmel (born 5 May 1935 in Markranstädt, Saxony) is a retired female javelin thrower and discus thrower from Germany, who represented her native country twice at the Summer Olympics: 1956 and 1960. She set her personal best (55.16 metres) in the women's javelin throw in 1968.

International competitions

References
 

1935 births
Living people
People from Markranstädt
German female javelin throwers
German female discus throwers
West German female javelin throwers
West German female discus throwers
Sportspeople from Saxony
Olympic athletes of the United Team of Germany
Athletes (track and field) at the 1956 Summer Olympics
Athletes (track and field) at the 1960 Summer Olympics
Universiade medalists in athletics (track and field)
Universiade gold medalists for West Germany
Universiade silver medalists for West Germany
Medalists at the 1961 Summer Universiade
Medalists at the 1963 Summer Universiade